OGN or Ogn may refer to:

 Original graphic novel
 Oregon Geographic Names
 OGN (TV channel)
 OGN (gene) (also called mimecan)
 Offshore Group Newcastle, or OGN Group, who make oil rigs on the River Tyne in Newcastle upon Tyne
 Ognøya
 IATA airport code of Yonaguni Airport
 ICAO airline code of Origin Pacific Airways
 Open Glider Network